Des Raj (1 January 1944 – 4 August 2013) was an Indian cricket umpire. He stood in one ODI game in 1998.

See also
 List of One Day International cricket umpires

References

1944 births
2013 deaths
Indian One Day International cricket umpires
People from Narowal District